Beauty Case was an Australian television series which aired from 12 February to 5 November 1958 on Sydney television station TCN-9. The weekly series was broadcast on Wednesdays. TV listings suggest the episodes usually aired in a 45-minute time-slot. Assuming the series had a sponsor, it is not known what the running time was minus the commercials.

As the title suggests, the series was about beauty and fashion. It was produced and compered by Elaine White. The week after the series ended, White began hosting a series called Home and Beauty on the same station.

References

External links

Nine Network original programming
1958 Australian television series debuts
1958 Australian television series endings
Black-and-white Australian television shows
English-language television shows
Australian non-fiction television series